A machine gun is a fully automatic, rifled autoloading firearm designed for sustained direct fire with rifle cartridges. Other automatic firearms such as automatic shotguns and automatic rifles (including assault rifles and battle rifles) are typically designed more for firing short bursts rather than continuous firepower, and are not considered true machine guns.

As a class of military kinetic projectile weapon, machine guns are designed to be mainly used as infantry support weapons and generally used when attached to a bipod or tripod, a fixed mount or a heavy weapons platform for stability against recoils.  Many machine guns also use belt feeding and open bolt operation, features not normally found on other infantry firearms.

Machine guns can be further categorized as light machine guns, medium machine guns, heavy machine guns, general purpose machine guns and squad automatic weapons.

Similar automatic firearms of  caliber or more are classified as autocannons, rather than machine guns.

Modern overview 

Unlike semi-automatic firearms, which require one trigger pull per round fired, a machine gun is designed to continue firing for as long as the trigger is held down.  Nowadays, the term is restricted to relatively heavy crew-served weapons, able to provide continuous or frequent bursts of automatic fire for as long as ammunition feeding is replete. Machine guns are used against infantry, low-flying aircraft, small boats and lightly/unarmored land vehicles, and can provide suppressive fire (either directly or indirectly) or enforce area denial over a sector of land with grazing fire. They are commonly mounted on fast attack vehicles such as technicals to provide heavy mobile firepower, armored vehicles such as tanks for engaging targets too small to justify the use of the primary weaponry or too fast to effectively engage with it, and on aircraft as defensive armament or for strafing ground targets, though on fighter aircraft true machine guns have mostly been supplanted by large-caliber rotary guns.

Some machine guns have in practice sustained fire almost continuously for hours; other automatic weapons overheat after less than a minute of use. Because they become very hot, the great majority of designs fire from an open bolt, to permit air cooling from the breech between bursts. They also usually have either a barrel cooling system, slow-heating heavyweight barrel, or removable barrels which allow a hot barrel to be replaced.

Although subdivided into "light", "medium", "heavy" or "general-purpose", even the lightest machine guns tend to be substantially larger and heavier than standard infantry arms. Medium and heavy machine guns are either mounted on a tripod or on a vehicle; when carried on foot, the machine gun and associated equipment (tripod, ammunition, spare barrels) require additional crew members.

Light machine guns are designed to provide mobile fire support to a squad and are typically air-cooled weapons fitted with a box magazine or drum and a bipod; they may use full-size rifle rounds, but modern examples often use intermediate rounds. Medium machine guns use full-sized rifle rounds and are designed to be used from fixed positions mounted on a tripod. The heavy machine gun is a term originating in World War I to describe heavyweight medium machine guns and persisted into World War II with Japanese Hotchkiss M1914 clones; today, however, it is used to refer to automatic weapons with a caliber of at least  but less than 20 mm. A general-purpose machine gun is usually a lightweight medium machine gun that can either be used with a bipod and drum in the light machine gun role or a tripod and belt feed in the medium machine gun role.

Machine guns usually have simple iron sights, though the use of optics is becoming more common. A common aiming system for direct fire is to alternate solid ("ball") rounds and tracer ammunition rounds (usually one tracer round for every four ball rounds), so shooters can see the trajectory and "walk" the fire into the target, and direct the fire of other soldiers.

Many heavy machine guns, such as the Browning M2 .50 caliber machine gun, are accurate enough to engage targets at great distances. This led to the introduction of .50 caliber anti-materiel sniper rifles, such as the Barrett M82.

Other automatic weapons are subdivided into several categories based on the size of the bullet used, whether the cartridge is fired from a closed bolt or an open bolt, and whether the action used is locked or is some form of blowback.

Fully automatic firearms using pistol-caliber ammunition are called machine pistols or submachine guns largely on the basis of size; those using shotgun cartridges are almost always referred to as automatic shotguns. The term personal defense weapon (PDW) is sometimes applied to weapons firing dedicated armor-piercing rounds which would otherwise be regarded as machine pistols or SMGs, but it is not particularly strongly defined and has historically been used to describe a range of weapons from ordinary SMGs to compact assault rifles. Selective fire rifles firing a full-power rifle cartridge from a closed bolt are called automatic rifles or battle rifles, while rifles that fire an intermediate cartridge are called assault rifles.

Assault rifles are a compromise between the size and weight of a pistol-caliber submachine gun and a full-size battle rifle, firing intermediate cartridges and allowing semi-automatic and burst or full-automatic fire options (selective fire), sometimes with both of the latter presents.

Operation 

Many machine guns are of the locked breech type, and follow this cycle:

 Pulling (manually or electrically) the bolt assembly/bolt carrier rearward by way of the cocking lever to the point bolt carrier engages a sear and stays at rear position until trigger is activated making bolt carrier move forward
 Loading fresh round into chamber and locking bolt
 Firing round by way of a firing pin or striker (except for aircraft medium calibre using electric ignition primers) hitting the primer that ignites the powder when bolt reaches locked position.
 Unlocking and removing the spent case from the chamber and ejecting it out of the weapon as bolt is moving rearward
 Loading the next round into the firing chamber. Usually, the recoil spring (also known as main spring) tension pushes bolt back into battery and a cam strips the new round from a feeding device, belt or box.
Cycle is repeated as long as the trigger is activated by operator. Releasing the trigger resets the trigger mechanism by engaging a sear so the weapon stops firing with bolt carrier fully at the rear.

The operation is basically the same for all locked breech automatic firearms, regardless of the means of activating these mechanisms.  There are also multi-chambered formats, such as revolver cannon, and some types, such as the Schwarzlose machine gun etc., that do not lock the breech but instead use some type of delayed blowback.

Design 

Most modern machine guns are of the locking type, and of these, most utilize the principle of gas-operated reloading, which taps off some of the propellant gas from the fired cartridge, using its mechanical pressure to unlock the bolt and cycle the action.  The first of these was invented by the French brothers Claire, who patented a gas operated rifle, which included a gas cylinder, in 1892. The Russian PK machine gun is a more modern example. Another efficient and widely used format is the recoil actuated type, which uses the gun's recoil energy for the same purpose. Machine guns such as the M2 Browning and MG42, are of this second kind. A cam, lever or actuator absorbs part of the energy of the recoil to operate the gun mechanism.

An externally actuated weapon uses an external power source, such as an electric motor or hand crank, to move its mechanism through the firing sequence. Modern weapons of this type are often referred to as Gatling guns, after the original inventor (not only of the well-known hand-cranked 19th century proto-machine gun, but also of the first electrically powered version). They have several barrels each with an associated chamber and action on a rotating carousel and a system of cams that load, cock, and fire each mechanism progressively as it rotates through the sequence; essentially each barrel is a separate bolt-action rifle using a common feed source. The continuous nature of the rotary action, and its relative immunity to overheating allow for a very high cyclic rate of fire, often several thousand rounds per minute. Rotary guns are less prone to jamming than a gun operated by gas or recoil, as the external power source will eject misfired rounds with no further trouble, but this is not possible in the rare cases of self-powered rotary guns. Rotary designs are intrinsically comparatively bulky and expensive, and are therefore generally used with large rounds, 20 mm in diameter or more, often referred to as Rotary cannon – though the rifle-calibre Minigun is an exception to this. Whereas such weapons are highly reliable and formidably effective, one drawback is that the weight and size of the power source and driving mechanism makes them usually impractical for use outside of a vehicle or aircraft mount.

Revolver cannons, such as the Mauser MK 213, were developed in World War II by the Germans to provide high-caliber cannons with a reasonable rate of fire and reliability. In contrast to the rotary format, such weapons have a single barrel and a recoil-operated carriage holding a revolving chamber with typically five chambers. As each round is fired, electrically, the carriage moves back rotating the chamber which also ejects the spent case, indexes the next live round to be fired with the barrel and loads the next round into the chamber. The action is very similar to that of the revolver pistols common in the 19th and 20th centuries, giving this type of weapon its name.  A Chain gun is a specific, patented type of Revolver cannon, the name, in this case, deriving from its driving mechanism.

As noted above, firing a machine gun for prolonged periods produces large amounts of heat. In a worst-case scenario, this may cause a cartridge to overheat and detonate even when the trigger is not pulled, potentially leading to damage or causing the gun to cycle its action and keep firing until it has exhausted its ammunition supply or jammed; this is known as cooking off ( as distinct from runaway fire where the sear fails to re-engage when the trigger is released). To guard against cook-offs occurring, some kind of cooling system or design element is required. Early machine guns were often water-cooled and while this technology was very effective, (and was indeed one of the sources of the notorious efficiency of machine guns during the First World War ), the water jackets also added considerable weight to an already bulky design; they were also vulnerable to the enemies' bullets themselves.  Armour could be provided, and in WW I the Germans in particular often did this; but this added yet more weight to the guns.  Air-cooled machine guns often feature quick-change barrels (often carried by a crew member), passive cooling fins, or in some designs forced-air cooling, such as that employed by the Lewis Gun. Advances in metallurgy and the use of special composites in barrel liners have allowed for greater heat absorption and dissipation during firing. The higher the rate of fire, the more often barrels must be changed and allowed to cool. To minimize this, most air-cooled guns are fired only in short bursts or at a reduced rate of fire. Some designs – such as the many variants of the MG42 – are capable of rates of fire in excess of 1,200 rounds per minute. Motorized Gatling guns are capable of the fastest firing rates of all, partly because this format involves extra energy being injected into the system from outside, instead of depending on energy derived from the propellant contained within the cartridges, partly because the next round can be inserted simultaneously with or before the ejection of the previous cartridge case, and partly because this design intrinsically deals with the unwanted heat very efficiently – effectively quick-changing the barrel and chamber after every shot.  The multiple guns that comprise a Gatling being a much larger bulk of metal than other, single-barreled guns, they are thus much slower to rise in temperature for a given amount of heat, while at the same time they are also much better at shedding the excess, as the extra barrels provide a larger surface area from which to dissipate the unwanted thermal energy.  In addition to that, they are in the nature of the design spun at very high speed during rapid fire, which has the benefit of producing enhanced air-cooling as a side-effect.

In weapons where the round seats and fires at the same time, mechanical timing is essential for operator safety, to prevent the round from firing before it is seated properly. Machine guns are controlled by one or more mechanical sears. When a sear is in place, it effectively stops the bolt at some point in its range of motion. Some sears stop the bolt when it is locked to the rear. Other sears stop the firing pin from going forward after the round is locked into the chamber. Almost all machine guns have a "safety" sear, which simply keeps the trigger from engaging.

History 

The first successful machine-gun designs were developed in the mid-19th century. The key characteristic of modern machine guns, their relatively high rate of fire and more importantly mechanical loading, first appeared in the Model 1862 Gatling gun, which was adopted by the United States Navy. These weapons were still powered by hand; however, this changed with Hiram Maxim's idea of harnessing recoil energy to power reloading in his Maxim machine gun. Dr. Gatling also experimented with electric-motor-powered models; as discussed above, this externally powered machine reloading has seen use in modern weapons as well.

While technical use of the term "machine gun" has varied, the modern definition used by the Sporting Arms and Ammunition Manufacturers' Institute of America is "a fully automatic firearm that loads, fires and ejects continuously when the trigger is held to the rear until the ammunition is exhausted or pressure on the trigger is released." This definition excludes most early manually operated repeating arms the Gatling gun and such as volley guns like the Nordenfelt gun.

Medieval 

The first known ancestors of multi-shot weapons were medieval organ guns. An early example of an attempt at the mechanisation of one of these would be an 'engine of war' produced in the mid-1570s in England capable of firing from 160 to 320 shots 4, 8, 12 or 24 bullets at a time at a rate of fire up to roughly 3 times the rate of fire of the typical arquebusier of the day. It was also claimed that the gun could be reloaded 'as often as you like' and fired no matter the weather though the English government never adopted the weapon despite testing being carried out at the Tower of London. The first firearms to have the ability to fire multiple shots from a single barrel without a full manual reload were revolvers made in Europe in the late 1500s. One is a shoulder-gun-length weapon made in Nuremberg, Germany, circa 1580. Another is a revolving arquebus, produced by Hans Stopler of Nuremberg in 1597.

17th century
True repeating long arms were difficult to manufacture prior to the development of the unitary firearm cartridge; nevertheless, lever-action repeating rifles such as the Kalthoff repeater and Cookson repeater were made in small quantities in the 17th century.

Perhaps the earliest examples of predecessors to the modern machine gun are to be found in East Asia. According to the Wu-Pei-Chih, a booklet examining Chinese military equipment produced during the first quarter of the 17th century, the Chinese army had in its arsenal the 'Po-Tzu Lien-Chu-P'ao' or 'string-of-100-bullets cannon'. This was a repeating cannon fed by a hopper containing balls which fired its charges sequentially. The way it worked was similar to the Perkins steam gun of 1824 or the Beningfield electrolysis gun of 1845 only slow-burning gunpowder was used as the propelling force in place of steam or the gases produced by electrolysis. Another repeating gun was produced by a Chinese commoner, Dai Zi, in the late 17th century. This weapon was also hopper-fed and never went into mass production.

In 1655, a way of loading, aiming and shooting up to 6 wall muskets 60 times in a minute for a total rate of fire of 360 shots per minute was mentioned in The Century of Inventions by Edward Somerset, 2nd Marquess of Worcester, though, like all the inventions mentioned in the book, it is uncertain if it was ever built.

It is sometimes claimed (i.e. in George Morgan Chinn's the Machine Gun) that in 1663 the first mention of the automatic principle of machine guns was in a paper presented to the Royal Society of England by Palmer, an Englishman who described a volley gun capable of being operated by either recoil or gas. However, no one has been able to find this paper in recent times and all references to a multi-shot weapon by a Palmer during this period appear to be referring to a somewhat more common Kalthoff repeater or Lorenzoni-system gun. Despite this, there is a reference in 1663 to at least the concept of a genuine automatic gun that was presented to Prince Rupert, though its type and method of operation are unknown.

18th century

In 1708, it was reported from Constantinople that a French officer had invented a very light cannon that could fire from a single barrel 30 shots in 2 and a half minutes for a total rate of fire of 12 shots a minute.

In 1711, a French lawyer called Barbuot  presented to the parliament of Dijon a crank-operated 'war machine' made up of 10 carbine barrels and loaded via a 'drum' capable of firing in vollies. It was said to be accurate at 400 to 500 paces and to strike with enough force to pierce 2 or 3 men at a time when close. It was also claimed to be able to shoot 5 or 6 times before infantry came within musket range or cavalry within pistol range and with no more space between each shot than the time needed to prime a pistol, cock it and release the hammer as well as being nearly as manoeuvrable as cavalry. An alternative and heavier version was said to be able to throw grenades and it was also proposed to equip the machine with a bellows for clearing smoke that built up during firing.

Another early revolving gun was created by James Puckle, a London lawyer, who patented what he called "The Puckle Gun" on May 15, 1718. It was a design for a manually operated 1.25 in. (32 mm) caliber, flintlock cannon with a revolver cylinder able to fire 6–11 rounds before reloading by swapping out the cylinder, intended for use on ships. It was one of the earliest weapons to be referred to as a machine gun, being called such in 1722, though its operation does not match the modern usage of the term. According to Puckle, it was able to fire round bullets at Christians and square bullets at Turks. However, it was a commercial failure and was not adopted or produced in any meaningful quantity.

In 1720, a French inventor called Philippe Vayringe invented a small cannon that could fire 16 shots in succession which he demonstrated before the Duke of Lorraine. In 1737, it was mentioned that Jacob de Weinholtz, a Dane who was serving in the Portuguese army, had invented a cannon capable of firing 20 to 30 shots a minute though requiring 15 people to work it. The cannons were brought along with a Portuguese fleet sent to India to take part in a colonial war in the 1740s. Also in 1737 it was mentioned that a German engineer had invented a 10-pounder cannon capable of firing 20 times in a minute. In 1740, a cannon able to shoot 11 times per minute was developed by a Frenchman called Chevalier de Benac. Meanwhile, not long after in England, in 1747 a cannon able to simultaneously charge and discharge itself 20 times in a minute was invented by James Allis and presented to the Royal Society of England. In 1750, in Denmark a Prussian known as Captain Steuben of the Train of Artillery invented a breech-loading cannon worked by 4 people and fed by paper cartridges capable of firing 24 times in a minute and demonstrated it to the King of Denmark along with some other high-ranking officials in the same year. In 1764, Frenchman Ange Goudar wrote in his work The Chinese Spy that he had assisted in Paris in the proofing of a 'great gun' capable of firing 60 times in a minute. In 1773, another cannon capable of firing 23 or 24 times in a minute and cleaning itself after every shot was invented by Thomas Desaguliers. In 1775, it was mentioned that in England two large cannons invented by an unidentified matross at Woolwich had achieved a rate of fire of 59 shots in 59 and a half seconds.

Also in 1775, a breech-loading volley gun, similar to the later mitrailleuse, was invented by a Frenchman called Du Perron which was worked by 3 or 4 men and capable of discharging 24 barrels 10 times a minute for a total rate of fire of 240 shots per minute.

In 1776, a gun capable of charging and discharging itself 120 times 'by the motion of one hand only' in a minute was invented in England by an inventor from the county of Westmoreland.

In 1777, Philadelphia gunsmith Joseph Belton offered the Continental Congress a "new improved gun", which was capable of firing up to twenty shots in five seconds; unlike older repeaters using complex lever-action mechanisms, it used a simpler system of superposed loads, and was loaded with a single large paper cartridge. Congress requested that Belton modify 100 flintlock muskets to fire eight shots in this manner, but rescinded the order when Belton's price proved too high.

In 1779, a machine made up of 21 musket barrels worked by 3 men was produced by a British inventor called William Wilson Wright which he claimed could be fired 3 times quicker than a single man could load and fire a musket 3 times.

In 1788, a Swiss soldier invented a machine worked by 10 men capable of discharging 300 balls in 3 minutes.

Also in 1788, it was reported that a Prussian officer had invented a gun capable of firing 400 balls one after the other.

In 1790, a former officer in the French military known as Joseph-François-Louis Grobert invented a 'ballistic machine' or 'pyroballistic machine' with multiple barrels operated by 4 men and a continuous rotational movement capable of firing 360 rifle shots a minute in a variety of calibers.

In 1792, a French artist known as Renard invented a piece of ordnance that could be operated by one man and fired 90 shots a minute.

Also in 1792, a French mechanic called Garnier invented a musket battery made up of 15 barrels capable of firing 300 shots in 2 minutes for a total rate of fire of 150 shots a minute or 10 shots per minute per barrel and of being operated by one man.

19th century
In the early and mid-19th century, a number of rapid-firing weapons appeared which offered multi-shot fire, mostly volley guns. Volley guns (such as the Mitrailleuse) and double-barreled pistols relied on duplicating all parts of the gun, though the Nock gun used the otherwise-undesirable "chain fire" phenomenon (where multiple chambers are ignited at once) to propagate a spark from a single flintlock mechanism to multiple barrels. Pepperbox pistols also did away with needing multiple hammers but used multiple manually operated barrels. Revolvers further reduced this to only needing a pre-prepared cylinder and linked advancing the cylinder to cocking the hammer. However, these were still manually operated.

In 1805 a British inventor from Northampton designed a cannon that would prime, load and fire itself 10 times a minute.

In 1806 a Viennese copper engraver and mechanic known as Mr Putz invented a machine cannon that could load, fire and clean itself once every second or potentially up to 60 times a minute though the rate of fire was limited by the overheating of the barrel.

In 1819 an American inventor from Baltimore designed a gun with 11 barrels that could fire 12 times in a minute for a total rate of fire of 132 shots a minute.

In 1821, a muzzle-loading repeating cannon capable of firing 30 shots in 6 minutes or 5 shots per minute was demonstrated in England by the French-American "Fire King" Ivan Ivanitz Chabert. It was worked by a "wheel" fed by paper cartridges from a store attached to the cannon and ignited using a match from a match-holder somewhere else on the cannon.

In 1828, a swivel gun that did not need cleaning or muzzle-loading and was capable of being made to any dimensions and used as an ordinary cannon at a moment's notice and firing 40 shots a minute was invented by a native of Ireland.

In France, in 1831, a mechanic from the Vosges department invented a lever-operated cannon that could fire 100 shots a minute.

In 1832, a machine capable of firing 500 rifle shots a minute was devised by Hamel, a French mechanic.

In the mid-1830s, a machine gun was designed by John Steuble (Swiss), who tried to sell it to the Russian, English and French governments. The English and Russian governments showed interest but the former refused to pay Steuble, who later sued them for this transgression, and the latter tried to imprison him. The French government showed interest at first and while it noted that mechanically there was nothing wrong with Steuble's invention it turned him down, stating that the machine both lacked novelty and could not be usefully employed by the army. The gun was reportedly breech-loading, fed by cartridges from some kind of hopper and could fire 34 barrels of one-inch calibre 4 or 6 times for a total of 136 or 204 shots a minute.

A biography of William Lyon Mackenzie mentions that in 1839 a Detroit-based inventor was working on a cannon that could be fired 50 to 60 times in a minute.

In 1842, Dr. Thomson or Thompson, an American, invented a cannon fed by pre-loaded breech-pieces with 4 barrels that was operated by means of a revolving cylinder and could be fired 50 times in as many seconds or even up to 500 times in 500 seconds.

In 1846, Mr. Francis Dixon, an American, invented a cannon that loaded, primed and discharged itself through the use of a brake at a rate of fire of 30 to 40 shots a minute. A variation of it was worked by clockwork-like machinery and could be made to move by itself a certain distance along rails before firing 10 times and returning to its original position.

Also in 1846, in Canada, inventor Simeon "Larochelle" Gautron, invented a cannon that was similar to a wooden model of a repeating cannon he constructed in 1836 but for which he had made a number of improvements since then which could be fired 10 or 12 times in a minute when the typical muzzle-loading cannon of the day could be fired at only a fraction of that speed, and an English newspaper reporting on it claimed it could be fired up to 60 times in the same period of time, and clean itself after every shot. It was worked by a crank, could be worked by one man when the typical cannon of the day required twelve or more, was fed by paper cartridges from a revolving cylinder and used separate percussion caps for ignition. Larochelle tried to interest the Canadian military in his invention but was turned down for reasons of complexity and expense which, while it drew some criticism from the French language Canadian press, led to the inventor discontinuing development of it in favour of more profitable activities. A model of Larochelle's cannon is still on display at the Musee National des Beaux-Arts du Quebec.

In 1847, a short description of a prototype electrically ignited mechanical machine gun was published in Scientific American by J.R. Nichols. The model described is small in scale and works by rotating a series of barrels vertically so that it is feeding at the top from a "tube" or hopper and could be discharged immediately at any elevation after having received a charge, according to the author.

In 1848, the Italian Cesare Rosaglio announced his invention of a machine gun capable of being operated by a single man and firing 300 rifle shots a minute or 12,000 in an hour after taking into account the time needed to reload the "tanks" of ammunition.

In June 1851, a model of a 'war engine' allegedly capable of firing 10,000 ball cartridges in 10 minutes was demonstrated by a British inventor called Francis McGetrick.

In 1852, a rotary cannon using a unique form of wheellock ignition was demonstrated by Delany, an Irish immigrant to America.

In 1854, a British patent for a mechanically operated machine gun was filed by Henry Clarke. This weapon used multiple barrels arranged side by side, fed by a revolving cylinder that was in turn fed by hoppers, similar to the system used by Nichols. The gun could be fired by percussion or electricity, according to the author. Unlike other mechanically operated machine guns of the era, this weapon did not use any form of self-contained cartridge, with firing being carried out by separate percussion caps. In the same year, water cooling was proposed for machine guns by Henry Bessemer, along with a water cleaning system, though he later abandoned this design. In his patent, Bessemer describes a hydropneumatic delayed-blowback-operated, fully automatic cannon. Part of the patent also refers to a steam-operated piston to be used with firearms but the bulk of the patent is spent detailing the former system.

In America, a patent for a machine gun-type weapon was filed by John Andrus Reynolds in 1855. Another early American patent for a manually operated machine gun with a blowback-operated cocking mechanism was filed by C. E. Barnes in 1856.

In France and Britain, a mechanically operated machine gun was patented in 1856 by Frenchman Francois Julien. This weapon was a cannon that fed from a type of open-ended tubular magazine, only using rollers and an endless chain in place of springs.

The Agar Gun, otherwise known as a "coffee-mill gun" because of its resemblance to a coffee mill, was invented by Wilson Agar at the beginning of the US Civil War. The weapon featured mechanized loading using a hand crank linked to a hopper above the weapon. The weapon featured a single barrel and fired through the turning of the same crank; it operated using paper cartridges fitted with percussion caps and inserted into metal tubes that acted as chambers; it was therefore functionally similar to a revolver. The weapon was demonstrated to President Lincoln in 1861. He was so impressed with the weapon that he purchased 10 on the spot for $1,500 apiece. The Union Army eventually purchased a total of 54 of the weapons.  However, due to antiquated views of the Ordnance Department the weapons, like its more famous counterpart the Gatling Gun, saw only limited use.

The Gatling gun, patented in 1861 by Richard Jordan Gatling, was the first to offer controlled, sequential fire with mechanical loading. The design's key features were machine loading of prepared cartridges and a hand-operated crank for sequential high-speed firing. It first saw very limited action in the American Civil War; it was subsequently improved and used in the Franco-Prussian war and North-West Rebellion. Many were sold to other armies in the late 19th century and continued to be used into the early 20th century until they were gradually supplanted by Maxim guns.  Early multi-barrel guns were approximately the size and weight of contemporary artillery pieces, and were often perceived as a replacement for cannon firing grapeshot or canister shot.  The large wheels required to move these guns around required a high firing position, which increased the vulnerability of their crews.  Sustained firing of gunpowder cartridges generated a cloud of smoke, making concealment impossible until smokeless powder became available in the late 19th century.  Gatling guns were targeted by artillery they could not reach, and their crews were targeted by snipers they could not see.  The Gatling gun was used most successfully to expand European colonial empires, since against poorly equipped indigenous armies it did not face such threats.

In 1864, in the aftermath of the Second Schleswig War, Denmark started a program intended to develop a gun that used the recoil of a fired shot to reload the firearm though a working model would not be produced until 1888.

In 1870, a Lt. Holsten Friberg of the Swedish army patented a fully automatic recoil-operated firearm action and may have produced firing prototypes of a derived design around 1882: this was the forerunner to the 1907 Kjellman machine gun, though, due to rapid residue buildup from the use of black powder, Friberg's design was not a practical weapon.

Also in 1870, the Bavarian regiment of the Prussian army used a unique mitrailleuse-style weapon in the Franco-Prussian war. The weapon was made up of four barrels placed side by side that replaced the manual loading of the French mitrailleuse with a mechanical loading system featuring a hopper containing 41 cartridges at the breech of each barrel. Although it was used effectively at times, mechanical difficulties hindered its operation and it was ultimately abandoned shortly after the war ended (de).

Maxim and World War I 

The first practical self-powered machine gun was invented in 1884 by Sir Hiram Maxim. The Maxim machine gun used the recoil power of the previously fired bullet to reload rather than being hand-powered, enabling a much higher rate of fire than was possible using earlier designs such as the Nordenfelt and Gatling weapons. Maxim also introduced the use of water cooling, via a water jacket around the barrel, to reduce overheating. Maxim's gun was widely adopted, and derivative designs were used on all sides during the First World War. The design required fewer crew and was lighter and more usable than the Nordenfelt and Gatling guns. First World War combat experience demonstrated the military importance of the machine gun. The United States Army issued four machine guns per regiment in 1912, but that allowance increased to 336 machine guns per regiment by 1919.

Heavy guns based on the Maxim such as the Vickers machine gun were joined by many other machine weapons, which mostly had their start in the early 20th century such as the Hotchkiss machine gun. Submachine guns (e.g., the German MP 18) as well as lighter machine guns (the first light machine gun deployed in any significant number being the Madsen machine gun, with the Chauchat and Lewis gun soon following) saw their first major use in World War I, along with heavy use of large-caliber machine guns. The biggest single cause of casualties in World War I was actually artillery, but combined with wire entanglements, machine guns earned a fearsome reputation.

Another fundamental development occurring before and during the war was the incorporation by gun designers of machine gun auto-loading mechanisms into handguns, giving rise to semi-automatic pistols such as the Borchardt (1890s), automatic machine pistols and later submachine guns (such as the Beretta 1918).

Aircraft-mounted machine guns were first used in combat in World War I. Immediately this raised a fundamental problem. The most effective position for guns in a single-seater fighter was clearly, for the purpose of aiming, directly in front of the pilot; but this placement would obviously result in bullets striking the moving propeller. Early solutions, aside from simply hoping that luck was on the pilot's side with an unsynchronized forward-firing gun, involved either aircraft with pusher props like the Vickers F.B.5, Royal Aircraft Factory F.E.2 and Airco DH.2, wing mounts like that of the Nieuport 10 and Nieuport 11 which avoided the propeller entirely, or armored propeller blades such as those mounted on the Morane-Saulnier L which would allow the propeller to deflect unsynchronized gunfire. By mid 1915, the introduction of a reliable gun synchronizer by the Imperial German Flying Corps made it possible to fire a closed-bolt machine gun forward through a spinning propeller by timing the firing of the gun to miss the blades. The Allies had no equivalent system until 1916 and their aircraft suffered badly as a result, a period known as the Fokker Scourge, after the Fokker Eindecker, the first German plane to incorporate the new technology.

Interwar era and World War II 

As better materials became available following the First World War, light machine guns became more readily portable; designs such as the Bren light machine gun replaced bulky predecessors like the Lewis gun in the squad support weapon role, while the modern division between medium machine guns like the M1919 Browning machine gun and heavy machine guns like the Browning M2 became clearer. New designs largely abandoned water jacket cooling systems as both undesirable, due to a greater emphasis on mobile tactics; and unnecessary, thanks to the alternative and superior technique of preventing overheating by swapping barrels.

The interwar years also produced the first widely used and successful general-purpose machine gun, the German MG 34. While this machine gun was equally able in the light and medium roles, it proved difficult to manufacture in quantity, and experts on industrial metalworking were called in to redesign the weapon for modern tooling, creating the MG 42. This weapon was simpler, cheaper to produce, fired faster, and replaced the MG 34 in every application except vehicle mounts since the MG 42's barrel changing system could not be operated when it was mounted.

Cold War 

Experience with the MG42 led to the US issuing a requirement to replace the aging Browning Automatic Rifle with a similar weapon, which would also replace the M1919; simply using the MG42 itself was not possible, as the design brief required a weapon which could be fired from the hip or shoulder like the BAR. The resulting design, the M60 machine gun, was issued to troops during the Vietnam War.

As it became clear that a high-volume-of-fire weapon would be needed for fast-moving jet aircraft to reliably hit their opponents, Gatling's work with electrically powered weapons was recalled and the 20 mm M61 Vulcan designed; a miniaturized 7.62 mm version initially known as the "mini-Vulcan" and quickly shortened to "minigun" was soon in production for use on helicopters, where the volume of fire could compensate for the instability of the helicopter as a firing platform.

Human interface 

The most common interface on machine guns is a pistol grip and trigger. On earlier manual machine guns, the most common type was a hand crank. On externally powered machine guns, such as miniguns, an electronic button or trigger on a joystick is commonly used. Light machine guns often have a buttstock attached, while vehicle and tripod mounted machine guns usually have spade grips. In the late 20th century, scopes and other complex optics became more common as opposed to the more basic iron sights.

Loading systems in early manual machine guns were often from a hopper of loose (un-linked) cartridges. Manual-operated volley guns usually had to be reloaded manually all at once (each barrel reloaded by hand, or with a set of cartridges affixed to a plate that was inserted into the weapon). With hoppers, the rounds could often be added while the weapon was firing. This gradually changed to belt-fed types. Belts were either held in the open by the person, or in a bag or box. Some modern vehicle machine guns used linkless feed systems, however.

Modern machine guns are commonly mounted in one of four ways. The first is a bipod – often these are integrated with the weapon. This is common on light machine guns and some medium machine guns. Another is a tripod, where the person holding it does not form a "leg" of support. Medium and heavy machine guns usually use tripods. On ships, vehicles, and aircraft, machine guns are usually mounted on a pintle mount – basically, a steel post that is connected to the frame or body. Tripod and pintle mounts are usually used with spade grips. The last major mounting type is one that is disconnected from humans, as part of an armament system, such as a tank coaxial or part of an aircraft's armament. These are usually electrically fired and have complex sighting systems, for example, the US Helicopter Armament Subsystems.

See also 

 Assault rifle
 Autocannon
 Automatic rifle
 Breda (machine gun)
 Chain gun
 Crew-served weapon
 Firearm action
 Gatling gun
 General-purpose machine gun
 Glock Switch
 Heavy machine gun
 Light machine gun
 List of firearms
 List of machine guns
 List of multiple barrel machine guns
 Medium machine gun
 Minigun
 Mitrailleuse
 Personal defense weapon
 Revolver cannon
 Squad automatic weapon
 Submachine gun

References

External links 

Discover Military Machine Guns
"From Gatling to Browning" —September 1945 article in Popular Science
"How Machine Guns Work" – HowStuffWorks article on the operation of Machine Guns, animated diagrams are included
The REME Museum of Technology – machine guns
 – A patent for an early automatic cannon
Vickers machine gun site

 
1862 establishments in the United States
1862 introductions
American inventions
19th-century inventions